Georgi Misharin (born 11 May 1985 in Yekaterinburg, Soviet Union) is a Russian professional ice hockey defenseman who is currently playing for Torpedo Nizhny Novgorod in the Kontinental Hockey League (KHL).

Playing career
Misharin played with Dynamo Yekaterinburg in Russia before opting to play a junior season after he was selected by the Saginaw Spirit, 56th overall in the 2003 CHL Import draft. As a result he was drafted by the Minnesota Wild in the seventh round, 207th overall in the 2003 NHL Entry Draft.

Misharin returned to CSKA Moscow, signing a two-year contract, after two and a half seasons with Metallurg Magnitogorsk on May 13, 2013.

Career statistics

Regular season and playoffs

International

References

External links

1985 births
Avtomobilist Yekaterinburg players
HC CSKA Moscow players
HC Dynamo Moscow players
HC Neftekhimik Nizhnekamsk players
Metallurg Magnitogorsk players
Living people
Minnesota Wild draft picks
Russian ice hockey defencemen
Saginaw Spirit players
HC Sibir Novosibirsk players
Torpedo Nizhny Novgorod players